The Ardnakinna Lighthouse, is an active aid to navigation located on Bere Island, Co. Cork at the western entrance to Castletownbere.

History
The light, which provides navigation aid on the western entrance to Castletownberehaven, originated as a freestanding circular beacon, recommended in 1847, erected in 1850, and capped in 1863. The beacon was transferred to the Admiralty in 1902, and was discontinued in 1923.

An incident with a trawler in 1945 contributed to requests for navigation lights in 1948, and a positive recommendation in 1955, but it was only in 1964 that the Minister of Transport gave approval in principle.  The old beacon was agreed to be a suitable location, and as it already had a tower form, it required only a lighting device, and one was secured from a light-ship.  The 1500W lantern has mains and diesel-generator power.  The light was formally turned on 23 November 1965 and is looked after, along with two other lights, by an attendant at Castletownbere helicopter base.

See also

 List of lighthouses in Ireland

References

Lighthouses in Ireland
Lighthouses completed in 1850
1850 establishments in Ireland